Carl-Johan Sund (6 December 1869 – 11 June 1956) was a Swedish sports shooter. He competed in the 600m free rifle event at the 1912 Summer Olympics.

References

1869 births
1956 deaths
Swedish male sport shooters
Olympic shooters of Sweden
Shooters at the 1912 Summer Olympics
Sport shooters from Stockholm